"We got him" may refer to a quote related to:

 Operation Red Dawn (2003), which resulted in the capture of Saddam Hussein
 Operation Neptune Spear (2011), which resulted in the death of Osama bin Laden
 Boston Marathon bombing (2013), which was followed by the capture of Dzhokhar Tsarnaev and the death of Tamerlan Tsarnaev